Jeanette Nilsen (born 27 June 1972) is a Norwegian team handball player and World Champion from 1999. She was born in Skien. She received a bronze medal at the 2000 Summer Olympics in Sydney.

She currently plays for Njård IL, having joined the team in 2008 from Stabæk. She is also a teacher for physical education at Ullern Vgs in Oslo.

References

External links

1972 births
Living people
Norwegian female handball players
Olympic handball players of Norway
Handball players at the 2000 Summer Olympics
Olympic bronze medalists for Norway
Sportspeople from Skien
Olympic medalists in handball
Medalists at the 2000 Summer Olympics
21st-century Norwegian women